Berry Angriawan (born 3 October 1991) is an Indonesian badminton player affiliated with Djarum club.

Achievements

Southeast Asian Games 
Men's doubles

BWF World Junior Championships 
Boys' doubles

BWF World Tour (1 title, 1 runner-up) 
The BWF World Tour, which was announced on 19 March 2017 and implemented in 2018, is a series of elite badminton tournaments sanctioned by the Badminton World Federation (BWF). The BWF World Tours are divided into levels of World Tour Finals, Super 1000, Super 750, Super 500, Super 300 (part of the HSBC World Tour), and the BWF Tour Super 100.

Men's doubles

BWF Grand Prix (4 titles, 3 runners-up) 
The BWF Grand Prix had two levels, the Grand Prix and Grand Prix Gold. It was a series of badminton tournaments sanctioned by the Badminton World Federation (BWF) and played between 2007 and 2017.

Men's doubles

  BWF Grand Prix Gold tournament
  BWF Grand Prix tournament

BWF International Challenges/Series (7 titles, 1 runner-up) 
Men's doubles

Mixed doubles

  BWF International Challenge tournament
  BWF International Series tournament
  BWF Future Series tournament

BWF Junior International (2 titles) 
Boys' doubles

  BWF Junior International Grand Prix tournament
  BWF Junior International Challenge tournament
  BWF Junior International Series tournament
  BWF Junior Future Series tournament

Performance timeline

Indonesian team 
 Senior level

Individual competitions 
 Junior level

 Senior level

Record against selected opponents 
Men's doubles results against World Superseries finalists, World Superseries Finals semifinalists, World Championships semifinalists, and Olympic quarterfinalists paired with:

Rian Agung Saputro 

  Chai Biao & Hong Wei 1–1
  Fu Haifeng & Zhang Nan 0–1
  Liu Xiaolong & Qiu Zihan 0–1
  Markus Fernaldi Gideon & Kevin Sanjaya Sukamuljo 1–0
  Ricky Karanda Suwardi & Angga Pratama 0–2
  Hirokatsu Hashimoto & Noriyasu Hirata 0–1
  Takeshi Kamura & Keigo Sonoda 2–2
  Hiroyuki Endo & Kenichi Hayakawa 0–2
  Kim Gi-jung & Kim Sa-rang 1–2
  Ko Sung-hyun & Shin Baek-cheol 0–1
  Lee Yong-dae & Yoo Yeon-seong 0–1
  Koo Kien Keat & Tan Boon Heong 1–1

Ricky Karanda Suwardi 

  Cai Yun & Lu Kai 0–1
  Hong Wei & Fu Haifeng 0–1
  Liu Xiaolong & Qiu Zihan 0–1
  Lee Sheng-mu & Tsai Chia-hsin 0–2
  Mads Pieler Kolding & Mads Conrad-Petersen 1–0
  Mathias Boe & Carsten Mogensen 0–1
  Angga Pratama & Rian Agung Saputra 1–0
  Markis Kido & Markus Fernaldi Gideon 0–1
  Hirokatsu Hashimoto & Noriyasu Hirata 1–0
  Kenichi Hayakawa & Hiroyuki Endo 2–1
  Ko Sung-hyun & Shin Baek-cheol 0–1

Hardianto 

  Goh V Shem & Tan Wee Kiong 1-0
  Marcus Ellis & Chris Langridge 1-0
  Takeshi Kamura & Keigo Sonoda 0–1

References

External links 

 
 

1991 births
Living people
People from Sukabumi
Sportspeople from West Java
Indonesian male badminton players
Competitors at the 2013 Southeast Asian Games
Competitors at the 2017 Southeast Asian Games
Southeast Asian Games gold medalists for Indonesia
Southeast Asian Games silver medalists for Indonesia
Southeast Asian Games medalists in badminton
20th-century Indonesian people
21st-century Indonesian people